Wilkesia gymnoxiphium (Hawaiian iliau), is a species of flowering plant in the family Asteraceae that is endemic to the island of Kauai in Hawaii. It is classified as endangered on the IUCN Red List. Wilkesia is one of three genera, with Argyroxiphium (silverswords and greenswords) and Dubautia (a larger group with many varied species) that are believed to be descendant from a single species related to the North American tarweed. The members of these three genera constitute what is called the silversword alliance, a group whose exceedingly close genetic heritage is not reflected in their exceptionally diverse morphologies.

Description
Distinctive features include a usually unbranched, monocarpic axis, leaves in whorls of 9-15 that join to form a basal sheath around the stem, and peduncles that are commonly branched. Fountains of yellow, daisy-like flowers form mostly May to July. When unbranched the plant dies after flowering, but if it branches into multiple heads (as may happen if the top is broken off), each head will flower and die separately.

Habitat
This species occurs only on Kauai, on dry ridges or dry to mesic forests. The most common location is along the slopes of Waimea Canyon.

Heavily grazed by feral goats in the canyon, they are most often seen on inaccessible slopes. However, a dense population can be seen in a fenced enclosure just off the road heading to Kōkee State Park.

References

Madieae
Endemic flora of Hawaii
Biota of Kauai
Plants described in 1852
Taxa named by Asa Gray